Philip Stockton is a sound editor. 

On February 26, 2012, he won an Academy Award for the movie Hugo. He also won a 2011 BAFTA for his work on that film and also won Emmy Award for Boardwalk Empire.

References

External links

Sound editors
Living people
Year of birth missing (living people)
Place of birth missing (living people)
Best Sound Editing Academy Award winners
Best Sound BAFTA Award winners
Emmy Award winners